Live at Stubb's is a live album by Matisyahu. It was recorded live at Stubb's in Austin, Texas on February 19, 2005 under his record label Or Music. The album debuted at number 5 on the Billboard Reggae Albums Chart, then seven months later it debuted at number 176 on the Billboard 200. On the issue of January 7, 2006 it reached the top of on the Reggae Albums Chart, and on the issue of March 18, 2006 it reached number 30 on the Billboard 200. The album was also certified gold by the RIAA on February 27, 2006 with over 500,000 copies sold. On December 27, 2006 it was announced that Live at Stubb's was ranked 2nd on the Billboard Reggae album charts for the year. The CD contains the music video for "King Without a Crown".

Track listing
 "Sea to Sea" – 4:07
 "Chop 'Em Down" – 4:03
 "Warrior" – 7:58
 "Lord Raise Me Up" – 3:52
 "King Without a Crown" – 4:48
 "Aish Tamid" – 6:55
 "Beat Box" – 5:05
 "Fire and Heights" – 4:20
 "Exaltation" – 6:57
 "Refuge" – 4:02
 "Heights" – 3:23
 "Close My Eyes" – 4:26
 All songs written by Matisyahu Miller and Josh Werner except Lord Raise Me Up written by Benjamin Hesse and Matisyahu Miller.

Personnel
 Matisyahu Miller – Vocals, Beatboxing (on "Beatbox")
Roots Tonic:
 Aaron Dugan – Guitar
 Josh Werner – Bass guitar
 Jonah David – drums
 Yoni – MC (on "Beat Box")

Production
 Michael Caplan – Producer
 Angelo Montrone – Producer, Mixing, Mastering, Recording Engineer
 Jacob Harris – Producer, Manager (JDub Music)
 Charlie Boswell – Recording
 Kelly Stuart – Recording
 Micheal O'Reilly – Mixing
 Cambria Harkey – Photographer
 Malcom H. Harper – Recording Assistant Engineer
 Greg Klinginsmith – Assistant Engineer
 Gerard Bustos – Assistant Engineer
 Will Harrison – Assistant Engineer

Charts

Weekly charts

Year-end charts

References

External links
 JDUB Record label homepage
 OR Music Record label homepage
 Live at Stubb's lyrics
 "Live at Stubbs's Releases

Matisyahu albums
2005 live albums